Pannychis, from Greek words  ('all, every') and  ('night'), may refer to:

An all-night feast or ceremony of the ancient Eleusinian Mysteries
Pannychis, a courtesan given by the Jewish king Herod the Great to the king of Cappodocia as thanks for reconciling a Herod family dispute
Vigil, a period of purposeful sleeplessness, an occasion for devotional watching, or an observance
Panichida (панихида), the name for Memorial service (Orthodox) in Slavic languages